Gary is an unincorporated community in Howard County, Maryland, United States.
A postal stop operated between February 2, 1892, and June 13, 1918. The town is located at the crossroads of Sharp and Tridelphia Road near modern Woodbine, Maryland.

In 1898, Elbert Henry Gary almost renamed Gary, Indiana to prevent confusion with Gary, Maryland

References

Year of establishment missing
Unincorporated communities in Howard County, Maryland
Unincorporated communities in Maryland